Uno is a Swedish, Finnish and Estonian male given name, which is derived from the Old Norse name Une. Uno can also be seen as derived from the Latin word unus (one).

People with the given name Uno 
 Uno Aava (born 1928), Estonian racing driver and sports historian
 Uno Åhrén (1897-1977), Swedish architect
 Uno Berg (1909–2001), Swedish sports shooter
 Uno Cygnaeus (1810-1888), Finnish clergyman and educator
 Uno Henning (1895-1970), Swedish actor
 Uno Hilden (1890-1951), Finnish politician
 Uno Kajak (born 1933), Estonian skier 
 Uno Källe (1931–2009), Estonian competitive runner 
 Uno Kaskpeit (born 1957), Estonian politician
 Uno Laht (1924–2008), Estonian writer
 Uno Lamm (1904–1989), Swedish electrical engineer and inventor
 Uno Laur (born 1961), Estonian singer (Röövel Ööbik)
 Uno Loop (1930–2021), Estonian singer, musician, athlete, actor and educator
 Uno Mereste (1928–2009), Estonian economist and politician
 Uno Naissoo (1928–1980), Estonian composer and musician
 Uno Öhrlund (born 1937), Swedish ice hockey player 
 Uno Palu (born 1933), Estonian decathlete
 Uno Piir (born 1929), Estonian footballer and coach
 Uno Prii (1924–2000), Estonian-born Canadian architect
 Uno Röndahl (1924–2011), Swedish author
 Uno Svenningsson (born 1959), Swedish pop singer
 Uno Tölpus (1928–1964), Estonian architect
 Uno von Troil (1746-1803), Swedish Archbishop of Uppsala from 1786 to 1803
 Uno Troili (1815-1875), Swedish portrait painter 
 Uno Ugandi (1931–2020), Estonian physician and politician
 Uno Ullberg (1879–1944), Finnish architect 
 Uno Vallman (1913–2004), Swedish painter
 Uno Willers (1911–1980), Swedish librarian

See also
Uno (surname)
Uno (disambiguation)
Uuno

Swedish masculine given names
Finnish masculine given names
Estonian masculine given names